Glyphipterix argyromis is a species of sedge moth in the genus Glyphipterix first described by Edward Meyrick in 1907. It was described by Edward Meyrick in 1907. It is found in southern India and Sri Lanka.

References

Moths described in 1907
Glyphipterigidae
Moths of Asia
Moths of Sri Lanka